State Highway 57 (SH 57) is a New Zealand state highway, linking State Highway 1 north of Ohau to State Highway 3 east of Ashhurst, via Levin, Shannon, Massey University and the southern suburbs of Palmerston North. The highway connects State Highway 1 traffic coming north from Wellington to the city of Palmerston North, and further to the Manawatu Gorge, allowing passage to the eastern side of the North Island and to the twin cities of Napier and Hastings. The highway is classified by the NZTA as a national strategic road.

State Highway 57 broadly follows the route of the North Island Main Trunk railway line to Linton, then follows the route of the Manawatu River for the remainder of its length. For its entire length, the highway is single carriageway with occasional passing lanes and at-grade intersections.

Route
State Highway 57 starts south of Levin, 2 km north of the locality of Ohau. The highway immediately crosses the North Island Main Trunk at level, before heading eastwards on Kimberley Road for two kilometres. SH 57 then turns sharply left onto Arapaepae Road and heads northwards, bypassing and forming the eastern boundary of Levin.

SH 57 proceeds straight to Ihakara, before gently winding its way over Laws Hill to the southeastern corner of the town of Shannon. The highway S-bends through the town, ending up running parallel to the North Island Main Trunk as it exits the town. SH 57 runs straight parallel to the NIMT for five kilometres to Makerua, where the highway meets SH 56 the only state highway met by SH 57 other than at its termini.

The highway moves its route away from the railway line, meandering to the east slightly and crossing the many branches of the Tokomaru River, a tributary to the Manawatu River. SH 57 then passes through Tokomaru, then briefly runs parallel to the NIMT again for the last time before the NIMT crosses the Manawatu River to Palmerston North.

SH 57 continues in a northeasterly direction through the locality of Linton, then proceeds to the Linton Military Camp, passing south of the actual camp itself. West of the military camp, SH 57 intersects with Tennant Drive, which takes traffic off the highway for the city of Palmerston North. As the connection from Tennant Drive to SH 57 southbound is given priority, SH 57 itself turns right onto Old West Road, passing south of the campus of Massey University, to Summerhill.

At Summerhill, SH 57 turns right onto Aokautere Drive, while the road to the left proceeds into Palmerston North. The highway passes north of the International Pacific College and through the outlying Palmerston North suburb of Summerhill. Much of Summerhill has only been developed since the late 1990s, so most of the suburb has been built with State Highway 57 as the arterial route. Leaving Summerhill, the road meets up with the Manawatu River and follows it general route for the remainder of the highways length.

At Aokautere, the highway intersects with the northern end of the Pahiatua Track, a local route over the northern foothills of the Tararua Ranges to the town of Pahiatua. This road is heavily trafficked in the event of the closure of the Manawatu Gorge due to slips. State Highway 57 between Aokautere and Ashhurst is then used to take traffic from State Highway 3 to the Pahiatua Track.

From Aokautere, the highway proceeds straight on the southern banks of the Manawatu River to the western end of the Manawatu Gorge. Two kilometres southeast of the town of Ashhurst, and one kilometre from the western end of the Manawatu Gorge, State Highway 57 meets State Highway 3 and terminates.

History
SH 57 once started in central Levin, turning right off SH 1 Oxford Street into Queen Street East, then turning left onto Arapaepae Road. The route was later moved 4 km south to Kimberley Road, avoiding Levin.

The 19 km section of SH 57 between the Tennant Drive intersection and State Highway 3 at Ashhurst was once designated SH 57A. SH 57 itself used to follow Tennant Drive around the northern side of the Massey University campus, then cross over the Manawatu River on the Fitzherbert Bridge into Palmerston North. It followed Fitzherbert Avenue as far as Ferguson Street, where it terminated onto SH 56 which at the time connected to SH 3 via Ferguson Street and Princess Street. For a short time, SH 57 was then shifted further west, diverting onto Opiki Road terminating at Tiakitahuna with SH 56 (and covering part of the route SH 56 now occupies), and SH 57A was revoked. In 1997, SH 56 and 57 were significantly changed with SH 57 reverting to its former designation, but instead bypassing Palmerston North and taking the route of the former SH 57A to Ashhurst, a distance of 38.5 km.

Major junctions

See also
 List of New Zealand state highways

References

External links
New Zealand Transport Agency

57
Transport in Manawatū-Whanganui